WTAB (1370 AM) is an American AM radio station broadcasting a Full service format, comprising news, sports, local information and country music Monday through Saturday and Gospel programming Sundays. Licensed to Tabor City, North Carolina, it serves the area, which also includes Tabor City's "twin city", Loris, South Carolina. The station is currently owned by WTAB Media Inc., and is run by the father and son team of Jack "The Colonel" Miller and Richard "Fluff" Miller. Jack hosts the popular "Swap Shop" show while Richard hosts both mornings and afternoons. Other station employees included Bobby Pait, station engineer Lloyd Gore, who has been with WTAB since 1969 and doubles as a fill-in and weekend host and Rodney Inman, who hosts the Sunday morning Gospel show and owns a motorcycle shop in Tabor City.

History
WTAB signed on on July 1, 1954. On September 1, 1965 it gained a sister F.M. station with the addition of WTAB-FM/104.9 (later WKSM & now WYNA).

WTAB received notoriety in 2009 when Sal Governale and Richard Christy from The Howard Stern Show made prank calls to the station's "Swap Shop" program hosted by Jack Miller. According to Miller, the station's website ended up with over 10 million hits and even praised Stern for giving his station some word.

As of May 27, 2011, WTAB is now on the air 24 hours per day, 7 days a week. Previously, WTAB signed off usually at 6 P.M. (unless there was a football game) and returned to the air at 6 A.M. despite being licensed for 24-hour broadcasts.

WTAB was an early affiliate of Casey Kasem's American Top 40 in the early 1970s.

References

External links

TAB
Full service radio stations in the United States